Lee Zhi Qing (Chinese: 李志清; born 27 September 1998) is a Malaysian female badminton player. She won the 2016 Mauritius International and achieved a career-high ranking of 60 in women's doubles with Prajakta Sawant.

Career 
In 2016, she participated in the Mauritius International and won the women's doubles title partnered with Prajakta Sawant of India. Months later, Lee and Prajakta reached the semifinals of the Vietnam International Series. In 2017, she reached the semifinals of the Lao International partnered with Chin Kah Mun. She also competed in the 2019 Purple League.

Achievements

BWF International Challenge/Series
Women's doubles

 BWF International Challenge tournament
 BWF International Series tournament
 BWF Future Series tournament

References

External links 
 

Living people
1998 births
Malaysian female badminton players
Malaysian sportspeople of Chinese descent
21st-century Malaysian women